The Hornbostel-Sachs system of musical instrument classification groups all instruments in which sound is produced primarily through a vibrating membrane. This includes all drums.

Membranophones (2)

Struck membranophones (21)
Struck drums - instruments which have a struck membrane. This includes most types of drum, such as the timpani and snare drum.

Directly struck membranophones (211)
Instruments in which the membrane is struck directly, such as through bare hands, beaters or keyboards

211.1 Instruments in which the body of the drum is dish- or bowl-shaped (kettle drums)

211.11 Single instruments
Tamak'
Timpani

211.12 Sets of instruments
Tabla

211.2 Instruments in which the body is tubular (tubular drums)

211.21 Instruments in which the body has the same diameter at the middle and end (cylindrical drums)

211.211 Instruments which have only one usable membrane

211.211.1 Instruments in which the end without a membrane is open
Octoban

211.211.2 Instruments in which the end without a membrane is closed

211.212 Instruments which have two usable membranes
Tumdak'

211.212.1 Single instruments
Bass drum
Dunun
Snare drum
Tom-tom

211.212.2 Sets of instruments

211.22 Instruments in which the body is barrel-shaped (barrel drums)

211.221 Instruments which have only one usable membrane

211.221.1 Instruments in which the end without a membrane is open
Conga

211.221.2 Instruments in which the end without a membrane is closed

211.222 Instruments which have two usable membranes

211.222.1 Single instruments
Taiko - this term refers to any of the various Japanese drums.
 Byō-uchi-daiko
 Shime-daiko
 Okedō-daiko
 Gagakki
N-Odaiko - type of Taiko

211.222.2 Sets of instruments

211.23 Instruments in which the body is double-conical

211.231 Instruments which have only one usable membrane

211.231.1 Instruments in which the end without a membrane is open

211.231.2 Instruments in which the end without a membrane is closed

211.232 Instruments which have two usable membranes

211.232.1 Single instruments

211.232.2 Sets of instruments

211.24 Instruments in which the body is hourglass-shaped

211.241 Instruments which have only one usable membrane

211.241.1 Instruments in which the end without a membrane is open

211.241.2 Instruments in which the end without a membrane is closed

211.242 Instruments which have two usable membranes

211.242.1 Single instruments

211.242.2 Sets of instruments

211.25 Instruments in which the body is conical-shaped (conical drums)

211.251 Instruments which have only one usable membrane

211.251.1 Instruments in which the end without a membrane is open
Bongo drum

211.251.2 Instruments in which the end without a membrane is closed

211.252 Instruments which have two usable membranes

211.252.1 Single instruments

211.252.2 Sets of instruments

211.26 Instruments in which the body is goblet-shaped (goblet drums)

211.261 Instruments which have only one usable membrane

211.261.1 Instruments in which the end without a membrane is open
Djembe

211.261.2 Instruments in which the end without a membrane is closed
Dabakan

211.262 Instruments which have two usable membranes

211.262.1 Single instruments

211.262.2 Sets of instruments

211.3 Instruments in which the body depth is not greater than the radius of the membrane (frame drums)
Tambourine (the jingles also make this an idiophone)

211.31 Instruments which do not have a handle

211.311 Instruments which have only one usable membrane

211.312 Instruments which have two usable membranes

211.32 Instruments which have a handle

211.321 Instruments which have only one usable membrane
Bodhrán

211.322 Instruments which have two usable membranes

Shaken membranophones (212)
Instruments which are shaken, the membrane being vibrated by objects inside the drum (rattle drums)

Plucked membranophones (22)
Instruments with a string attached to the membrane, so that when the string is plucked, the membrane vibrates (plucked drums)
Some commentators believe that instruments in this class ought instead to be regarded as chordophones (see below).

Friction membranophones (23)
Instruments in which the membrane vibrates as a result of friction. With friction drums, the sound is produced rubbing, rather than striking.

Friction drums with stick (231)
Instruments in which the membrane is vibrated from a stick that is rubbed or used to rub the membrane

231.1 Instruments in which the stick is inserted in a hole in the membrane

231.11 Instruments in which the stick can not be moved and is subject to rubbing, causing friction on the membrane
Cuíca
Rommelpot

231.12 Instruments in which the stick is semi-movable, and can be used to rub the membrane

231.13 Instruments in which the stick is freely movable, and is used to rub the membrane

231.2 Instruments in which the stick is tied upright to the membrane

Friction drum with cord (232)
Instruments in which a cord, attached to the membrane, is rubbed
232.1 Instruments in which the drum is held stationary while playing

232.11 Instruments which have only one usable membrane
Buhay

232.12 Instruments which have two usable membranes

232.2 Instruments in which the drum is twirled by a cord, which rubs in a notch on the stick held by the player

Hand friction drums (233)
Instruments in which the membrane is rubbed by hand

Singing membranes (kazoos) (24)
This group includes kazoos, instruments which do not produce sound of their own, but modify other sounds by way of a vibrating membrane.

Free kazoos (241)
Instruments in which the membrane is vibrated by an unbroken column of wind, without a chamber

Tube or vessel kazoos (242)
Instruments in which the membrane is placed in a box, tube or other container
Kazoos
Eunuch flute

Unclassified membranophones (25)

These instruments may be classified with a suffix, depending on how the membrane is attached to the body:

6: Membrane glued to the body
7: Membrane nailed to the body
8: Membrane laced to the body
81: Lacing is cord- or ribbon-bracing, in which the cords stretch between membranes or in the form of a net
811: Lacing does not use a special device to stretch the cords
812: The middle of the lacing has ribbons or cords tied crossways to increase the tension of the lacing (tension ligature)
813: The lacing is zigzag, with every pair of strings attached to a ring or hoop (tension loop)
814: Wedges, placed between the body and the lacing, can be used to alter the tension by adjusting the positioning of the wedges
82: The lacing at the lower end is attached to a non-sonorous hide
821: Lacing does not use a special device to stretch the cords
822: The middle of the lacing has ribbons or cords tied crossways to increase the tension of the lacing (tension ligature)
823: The lacing is zigzag, with every pair of strings attached to a ring or hoop (tension loop)
824: Wedges, placed between the body and the lacing, can be used to alter the tension by adjusting the positioning of the wedges
83: The lacing at the lower end is attached to an auxiliary board
831: Lacing does not use a special device to stretch the cords
832: The middle of the lacing has ribbons or cords tied crossways to increase the tension of the lacing (tension ligature)
833: The lacing is zigzag, with every pair of strings attached to a ring or hoop (tension loop)
834: Wedges, placed between the body and the lacing, can be used to alter the tension by adjusting the positioning of the wedges
84: The lacing at the lower end is attached to flange, carved from a solid block
841: Lacing does not use a special device to stretch the cords
842: The middle of the lacing has ribbons or cords tied crossways to increase the tension of the lacing (tension ligature)
843: The lacing is zigzag, with every pair of strings attached to a ring or hoop (tension loop)
844: Wedges, placed between the body and the lacing, can be used to alter the tension by adjusting the positioning of the wedges
85: The lacing at the lower end is attached to a belt
851: Lacing does not use a special device to stretch the cords
852: The middle of the lacing has ribbons or cords tied crossways to increase the tension of the lacing (tension ligature)
853: The lacing is zigzag, with every pair of strings attached to a ring or hoop (tension loop)
854: Wedges, placed between the body and the lacing, can be used to alter the tension by adjusting the positioning of the wedges
86: The lacing at the lower end is attached to pegs inserted in the body of the drum
861: Lacing does not use a special device to stretch the cords
862: The middle of the lacing has ribbons or cords tied crossways to increase the tension of the lacing (tension ligature)
863: The lacing is zigzag, with every pair of strings attached to a ring or hoop (tension loop)
864: Wedges, placed between the body and the lacing, can be used to alter the tension by adjusting the positioning of the wedges
9: Membrane is bound to the body with a ring slipped on top of it
91: Membrane is attached by a ring made of cord
92: Membrane is attached by a ring made of a hoop
921: Drum has no mechanism
922: Drum has mechanism
9221: Drum has no pedals
9222: Drum has pedals

Lists of musical instruments by Hornbostel–Sachs number
Lists of percussion instruments